Nicholas Charles was an officer-at-arms.

Nic(h)olas or Nick Charles may also refer to:

Nicholas Charles (athlete), participated in 2002 Leeward Islands Junior Championships in Athletics
Nick Charles (politician) (born 1982), Maryland State Delegate
Nick Charles (author) (born 1945), British author and alcoholism treatment expert
Nick Charles (sportscaster) (1946–2011), American sportscaster
Nick Charles, fictional character in the novel The Thin Man and adapted for film
Nicholas Charles, actor in The Kitchen Toto

See also